The East African Civil Aviation Academy (EACAA), also known as the Soroti Flying School, is a Ugandan school that trains aircraft pilots and aircraft maintenance engineers.

Location 
The school is based at Soroti Airport, in the town of Soroti in the Eastern Region. The coordinates of the airport are 1°43'15.0"N; 33°37'03.0"E (Latitude:1.720833; Longitude:33.617500).

Overview
As of May 2018, the flying school was undergoing renovations and a certification process to become a center of aviation excellence in the region. New technical staff have been recruited, including (a) a Director (b) a Quality Manager (c) a Safety Manager (d) a Chief Engineering Instructor (d) Flying instructors (e) Ground instructors (f) Engineering instructors and (g) Flight Operations Instructors. At that time the school had nine training aircraft. By May 2018, nine pilot-trainees, seven aircraft maintenance engineers and fourteen flight operations officers had completed training during the calendar year. Another fifteen pilots, fifteen flight operations engineers and five aircraft maintenance engineers were expected to graduate during the second half of 2018.

History
EACAA was founded in September 1971 under the Directorate of Civil Aviation of the EAC. The government of Uganda, the East African Community (EAC), the United Nations Development Programme, and the International Civil Aviation Organization were the major contributors.

When the first EAC collapsed in 1977, the Ugandan government took over the management and maintenance of the school. In 2012, the government began the process of returning the school to the EAC.

In late 2013, the Ugandan government entered into preliminary discussions with Integra, a private Danish aviation company, to improve and manage the school at international standards under a public-private-partnership (PPP) arrangement. Discussions at the Ugandan cabinet level have also been held about returning the school to the EAC.

In 2014, the EAC Council of Ministers agreed to take it back. On 3 July 2014, the presidents of Kenya, Uganda, and Rwanda agreed in principle to re-instate the EACAA as one of the centres of excellence in the EAC.

However, due to the failure of partner states to remit operational and development funds to the school, the Ugandan Cabinet, in March 2019, formally resolved to take over the ownership and management of the academy.

It is expected that the academy will expand its training programs to include pilots and aircraft maintenance engineers from (a) UPDF Air Force (b) Uganda National Airlines Company (c) Uganda Police Air Wing (d) Ugandan Presidential Fleet (e) Commercial and General aviation. This would save Uganda millions of dollars in foreign exchange, currently spent on procuring this training outside the country.

See also
 Uganda Aviation School
 Moriah Aviation Training Centre
 List of aviation schools in Uganda

References

External links
 Homepage of EACAA
 Soroti Flying School pilot trainers strike over pay
 Uganda: President Agrees to Irish Training of Uganda Aviators

Soroti
Soroti District
Eastern Region, Uganda
Aviation schools in Uganda
Educational institutions established in 1971
1971 establishments in Uganda